Cham Tang (also Romanized as Cham-e Tang; also known as Chamangān and Chamtangān) is a village in Dashti-ye Esmail Khani Rural District, Ab Pakhsh District, Dashtestan County, Bushehr Province, Iran. At the 2006 census, its population was 95, in 20 families.

References 

Populated places in Dashtestan County